The International Eight Metre class are class of racing yachts.  Eight Metre boats (often called "Eights" or 8mR) are a construction class, meaning that the boats are not identical but are all designed to meet specific measurement formula, in this case International rule.  Before WW II, Eights were the most prestigious international yacht racing class and they are still raced around the world. "Eight metre" in class name does not, somewhat confusingly, refer to length of the boat, but product of the formula. 8mR boats are on average some 15 metres long. Between 1907 and 2008 approximately 500 8mR boats were built, 177 of them have survived until today.

History

The International Rule was set up in 1907 to replace earlier, simpler handicap system which were often local or at best, national, and often also fairly simple, producing extreme boats which were fast but lightly constructed and impractical.  The Eight Metre class was the medium size rating established under the rule and they were chosen as an Olympic class in 1908 Summer Olympics. The Eights remained in the Olympics until 1936.

Up till 1914 the 8 metre yachts were traditionally Gaff rig. This changed with the launch of Ierne by the Fife yard becoming the first yacht of the class using Bermuda rig. Over time Bermuda rigs became more popular thanks to much more convenient cruising.

New, modern eights are still built utilising newest contemporary technologies, at the rate of 1–3 boats per year. During the 1980s, many old sailboat classes experienced a revival of interest. The class has undergone a renaissance which has continued to the day, with many old yachts restored or rebuilt to racing condition, and 8mr competition is once again thriving with 25–35 boats participating annually at the 8mR Worlds. "The International Eight Register" includes  177 identified existing boats of a total of approximately 500 boats built from 1907 until today.

Events

World Championships

After a long break, the Worlds have been organized for the eight metres in four classes:

1. The World Cup.
2. The Sira Cup – All Classic eights built prior to 1968
3. The Neptune Trophy – All Classics with original deck plan build prior to 1970, wooden spars and Dacron sails
4. Vintage eights – Gaffs build before 1920.

References
 The International Rule – The Eight Metre Class – John Lammerts van Bueren, 2007

External links
 International Eight Metre Association
 Metre Boat Index
 North American Eight Metre Association
 British Eight Metre Association
 Finnish Eight Metre Association 
 Russian Eight Metre Association (Russian)

 
8 Metre
Keelboats
Olympic sailing classes
Development sailing classes